Italy has participated in all the World Athletics Indoor Championships since the beginning in 1985 IAAF World Indoor Games. Italy won a total of 24 medals (6 gold, 6 silver and 12 bronze). Italy is 21st on the all time medal table.

Medal count

Italy won 26 medals (7 gold) an ranked 21st in the all-time medal table of the championships. In six editions the azzurri team has not won any medals.

Medalists

1985

Italy participated with 19 competitors, 16 men (but one Roberto Ribaud in 400 m did not stsrt), and 3 women.

Men

Women

1987

Italy participated with 14 competitors, 9 men and 5 women.

Men

Women

1989

Italy participated with 11 competitors, 8 men and 3 women.

Men

Women

1991

Italy participated with 17 competitors, 13 men and 4 women.

Men

Women

1993

Italy participated with 19 competitors, 14 men and 5 women.

Men

Women

1995

Italy participated with 17 competitors, 13 men and 4 women.

Men

Women

2014
Italy at the 2014 IAAF World Indoor Championships competed in Portland from 7 to 9 March, with 12 athletes, 3 men and 9 women.

Men

Women

2016

Italy at the 2016 IAAF World Indoor Championships competed from 17 to 20 March, with 5 athletes, 2 men and 3 women and won a gold medal with Gianmarco Tamberi in the high jump.

Men

Women

2018

Italy at the 2018 IAAF World Indoor Championships competed in Birmingham from 1 to 4 March, with 13 athletes, 4 men and 9 women.

Men

Women

2022

Medalists

See also
 Athletics in Italy
 Italy national athletics team
 Italy at the World Championships in Athletics

References

External links
 Italy at the World Championships (from page 48) at Daeugu 2011 Media Guide by FIDAL

Italy
World Indoor Championships